The 2011 Nigerian Senate election in Rivers State was held on April 9, 2011, to elect members of the Nigerian Senate to represent Rivers State. George Thompson Sekibo representing Rivers East, Magnus Ngei Abe representing Rivers South East and Wilson Asinobi Ake representing Rivers West all won on the platform of Peoples Democratic Party.

Overview

Summary

Results

Rivers East 
Peoples Democratic Party candidate George Thompson Sekibo won the election, defeating other party candidates.

Rivers South East 
Peoples Democratic Party candidate Magnus Ngei Abe won the election, defeating other party candidates.

Rivers West 
Peoples Democratic Party candidate Wilson Asinobi Ake won the election, defeating party candidates.

References 

Rivers State Senate elections
Rivers State senatorial elections
Rivers State senatorial elections